Garvaghy is a civil parish in County Down, Northern Ireland. It is situated in the historic baronies of Iveagh Upper, Lower Half and Iveagh Lower, Lower Half. It is also a townland of 722 acres.

Townlands
Garvaghy civil parish contains the following townlands:

Ballooly
Balloolymore
Carnew
Castlevennon
Corbally
Enagh
Fedany
Garvaghy
Kilkinamurry
Killaney
Knockgorm
Shanrod
Tullinisky
Tullyorior

See also
List of civil parishes of County Down

References